Hydroxydecanoic acid may refer to:

 10-Hydroxydecanoic acid
 Myrmicacin (3-hydroxydecanoic acid)